Dillon Sean Maples (born May 9, 1992) is an American professional baseball pitcher. He has played in Major League Baseball (MLB) for the Chicago Cubs.

Career

Chicago Cubs
Maples attended Pinecrest High School in Southern Pines, North Carolina. He was also on the USA Baseball Under 18 team in 2010. The Chicago Cubs selected Maples in the 14th round of the 2011 Major League Baseball draft. He made his professional debut in 2012 with the Arizona League Cubs. From 2013 to 2016 he pitched for the Boise Hawks, Kane County Cougars, Arizona League Cubs, Eugene Emeralds, South Bend Cubs and Myrtle Beach Pelicans.

Maples started 2017 with Myrtle Beach and was promoted to the Tennessee Smokies and Iowa Cubs during the season. He has spent most of 2017-19 bouncing between Wrigley Field and Des Moines.

On September 14, 2019, Maples was ejected from the game in the ninth inning of a 14-1 win over the Pittsburgh Pirates for hitting two batters with pitches after warnings had been issued earlier in the game. On the season, Maples appeared in a career-high 14 games, registering a 5.40 ERA with a career-high 18 strikeouts in 11.2 innings of work. Maples only made two appearances for Chicago in 2020, recording a 18.00 ERA in 1.0 inning pitched.

In 2021, Maples made 28 appearances for the Cubs, posting a 2.59 ERA and 40 strikeouts. On September 19, 2021, Maples was designated for assignment by the Cubs.

Philadelphia Phillies
On March 15, 2022, Maples signed a minor league contract with the Philadelphia Phillies. He was released on June 25, 2022.

References

External links

1992 births
Living people
Baseball players from North Carolina
Major League Baseball pitchers
Chicago Cubs players
Arizona League Cubs players
Boise Hawks players
Kane County Cougars players
Eugene Emeralds players
South Bend Cubs players
Myrtle Beach Pelicans players
Tennessee Smokies players
Iowa Cubs players
People from Lee County, North Carolina